The Cathedral Church of St. Catharine of Siena is the seat of the Diocese of Allentown. It is located at 1825 Turner Street, Allentown, Pennsylvania.

History

Saint Catharine of Siena Parish was founded October 8, 1919, when Archbishop Dennis Cardinal Dougherty, Archdiocese of Philadelphia appointed the Reverend John C. Phelan as pastor of a new church in the west end of Allentown.

By 1952, the parish campus had grown greatly, with additions of a school and convent and there was a need for a new church. On June 9, 1952, Msgr. Leo Fink broke ground on the new church. The Most Reverend Joseph M. McShea, Auxiliary Bishop of the Archdiocese of Philadelphia laid the cornerstone of the new structure on April 26, 1953. The building was designed in the Colonial Revival style. The exterior is faced with a variegated salmon brick trimmed with Salem limestone. At the crossing formed by the transept, there is a tall spire topped with a cross. The windows are colonial glazed antique glass.

The Cathedral
In 1961, the Diocese of Allentown was carved out from the Archdiocese of Philadelphia. The St. Catharine of Siena parish was honored to learn that their church was to be the seat of the new bishop The church would become the Cathedral Church of St. Catharine of Siena.

The Most Reverend Joseph McShea, D.D. was installed as the first Bishop of Allentown on April 11, 1961, thus officially raising St. Catharine of Siena Church to a Cathedral.

Gallery

See also
List of Catholic cathedrals in the United States
List of cathedrals in the United States
 Roman Catholic Diocese of Allentown

References

External links

Official Cathedral Site
Diocese of Allentown Official Site 

Roman Catholic cathedrals in Pennsylvania
Roman Catholic Diocese of Allentown
Christian organizations established in 1919
Roman Catholic churches completed in 1953
Buildings and structures in Allentown, Pennsylvania
Churches in Lehigh County, Pennsylvania
Tourist attractions in Allentown, Pennsylvania
Colonial Revival architecture in Pennsylvania
20th-century Roman Catholic church buildings in the United States